GOST 10859 (1964) is a standard of the Soviet Union which defined how to encode data on punched cards. This standard allowed a variable word size, depending on the type of data being encoded, but only uppercase characters.

These include the non-ASCII “decimal exponent symbol” . It was used to express real numbers in scientific notation. For example: 6.0221415⏨23.

The  character was also part of the ALGOL programming language specifications and was incorporated into the then German character encoding standard ALCOR.  GOST 10859 also included numerous other non-ASCII characters/symbols useful to ALGOL programmers, e.g.: ∨, ∧, ⊃, ≡, ¬, ≠, ↑, ↓, ×, ÷, ≤, ≥, °, &, ∅, compare with ALGOL operators.

Character sets

See also 
 KOI-7 (GOST 13052-67) 
 KOI-8 (GOST 19768-74)

References 
  ГОСТ 10859-64. Машины вычислительные. Коды алфавитно-цифровые для перфокарт и перфолент.
 GOST 10859 (from the Computer Museum of University of Amsterdam)
 GOST 10859

Further reading 
 

Cyrillic alphabet representations
Character sets
GOST standards
Russian-language computing
Computing in the Soviet Union